The 1951 Boston College Eagles football team represented Boston College as an independent during the 1951 college football season. Led by first-year head coach Mike Holovak, the Eagles compiled a record of 3–6. Boston College played home games at Braves Field in Boston, Massachusetts.

Schedule

References

Boston College
Boston College Eagles football seasons
Boston College Eagles football
1950s in Boston